Jach'a Apachita (Aymara jach'a big, apachita the place of transit of an important pass in the principal routes of the Andes; name in the Andes for a stone cairn, a little pile of rocks built along the trail in the high mountains, also spelled Jacha Apacheta) is a mountain in the Andes of Bolivia, about  high. It is situated in the La Paz Department, Larecaja Province, Sorata Municipality. Jach'a Apachita lies northeast of the Janq'u Uma-Illampu massif of the Cordillera Real.

References 

Mountains of La Paz Department (Bolivia)